

The DFW D.I was a German fighter aircraft produced during World War I.

Design and development
The first DFW D.I prototype was similar to the DFW Floh with the exception of a 160 hp Mercedes D.III engine with a car-mounted radiator on the nose. The second prototype appeared months later fitted with twin Spandau machine guns, while the third prototype featured ailerons on the upper wingtips. The D.I first flew in 1917, leading to development of the DFW Dr.I triplane.

Specifications

References

Bibliography

1910s German fighter aircraft
D.I
Single-engined tractor aircraft
Biplanes
Aircraft first flown in 1917